Ihor Dolhov (birth: June 6, 1957, Slavuta, Ukraine) is a Ukrainian diplomat. Ambassador Extraordinary and Plenipotentiary of Ukraine. Deputy Defense Minister of Ukraine for European Integration.

Education 
Ihor Dolhov graduated from Taras Shevchenko National University of Kyiv in 1980, philologist, lecturer, PhD in linguistics

Career 
1980–1992 — he was assistant, the Department of the Russian Language and the Methodology of its Tuition as a Foreign Language Taras Shevchenko National University of Kyiv.

March 1992 – March 1993 — 1st Secretary Information Section Ministry of Foreign Affairs of Ukraine.

1994–1997 — he was Counselor Embassy of Ukraine in Finland

November 1997 to December 2000 — Deputy Head of the Department of Political Analysis and Planning Ministry of Foreign Affairs of Ukraine.

December 2000 to October 2001 — Deputy Head of the Main Directorate for Foreign Policy the Presidential Administration of Ukraine.

October 2001 to April 2002 — Director of the Department for Policy and Security — Head of the Directorate for Political Analysis and Information Ministry of Foreign Affairs of Ukraine.

From April 2002 to July 2004 — Ambassador Extraordinary and Plenipotentiary of Ukraine in the Republic of Turkey.

From September 2004 to January 2006 — Deputy Minister of Foreign Affairs of Ukraine.

From January 2006 to May 2008 — Ambassador Extraordinary and Plenipotentiary of Ukraine in the Federal Republic of Germany

From May 2008 to February 2009 — Head of the Main Directorate for Foreign Policy Secretariat of President of Ukraine.

From February 2009 to June 2010 — Ambassador at Large of the Department for Information Policy Ministry of Foreign Affairs of Ukraine.

From 22 July 2010 to 29 May 2015 — Ambassador Extraordinary and Plenipotentiary of Ukraine in Belgium, Luxembourg and NATO

From June 2015 to February 2017 — Deputy Defense Minister of Ukraine for European Integration.

From February 2017 — Ambassador Extraordinary and Plenipotentiary of Ukraine in Georgia.

References

External links
 Ministry of Foreign Affairs of Ukraine
 Mission of Ukraine to the North Atlantic Treaty Organization
 Ambassador Ihor Dolhov on Ukraine Crisis
 Why should Europe care what happens between Ukraine and Russia — Debating Europe Limbidis
 Institute of World Policy officially introduced the fashion for Ukraine at NATO headquarters
 Dolhov: Ukraine to extend its presence in Afghanistan after 2014
 Press conference by the Head of the Ukrainian Mission to NATO

Living people
1957 births
People from Slavuta
Ambassadors of Ukraine to Germany
Ambassadors of Ukraine to Turkey
Ambassadors of Ukraine to Belgium
Ambassadors of Ukraine to Luxembourg
Ukrainian politicians
Heads of mission of Ukraine to NATO
Ambassadors of Ukraine to Georgia (country)